Lai Enjue (Chinese:赖恩爵, 1795-1848), also known as Jian Ting (简廷) was a late Qing military general. He was from Dapeng Fortress, Xin'an County, Guangdong (within modern-day Dapeng New District, Shenzhen), and has ancestry from Zijin County, Guangdong. Lai fought the British in the Battle of Kowloon during the First Opium War in 1839 and was given the title of Baturu and an equivalent rank of Lieutenant General. On 25 December 1843, he was appointed as the Admiral of the Guangdong Navy. He served in this post until 1848 when he died of illness.

Just before Lai died, he told his family clan that his wish was to see the return of Hong Kong to China. Ten days before the handover of Hong Kong on 1 July 1997, more than a hundred of the Lai clan descendants from different parts of the world returned to their ancestral home to mark the event.

Lai worked directly under the orders of Emperor Guangxu and Lin Zexu, both prominent figures in the First Opium War. The current Kowloon Walled City's "Dapeng Association House" forms the remnants of what was previously Lai's garrison. His tomb is under the maintenance of the Shenzhen Cultural Protection Division.

References

Further reading 
 Draft History of Qing
 中華書局 胡禮忠/戴鞍鋼新撰 二十五史新編 晚清史 第56頁 
 香港華籍名人墓銘集 鄧家宙編著 百度、知網 及 林公案一書有關九龍尖沙咀之海戰，及官涌海戰述說，九龍寨城描述等
 The Taking of Hong Kong, by Susanna Hoe and Derek Roebuck; 香港大學出版社, 

1795 births
1848 deaths
People from Shenzhen
Hakka people
Hakka generals
Qing dynasty generals